Lycée Romain Rolland may refer to the following French schools:
Lycée Romain Rolland (Amiens) - Amiens
Lycée Romain Rolland (Clamecy) - Clamecy, Nièvre
Lycée Romain Rolland (Goussainville, Val-d'Oise) 
Lycée Romain Rolland (Ivry-sur-Seine) - Ivry-sur-Seine